Polecat Creek is a stream in Cass County in the U.S. state of Missouri.

Polecat Creek was named for the fact the area was a favorite hunting ground of polecats.

See also
List of rivers of Missouri

References

Rivers of Cass County, Missouri
Rivers of Missouri